Donja Međiđa  is a village in the municipality of Gradačac, Bosnia and Herzegovina.

Demographics 
According to the 2013 census, its population was 1,353.

References

Populated places in Gradačac